Mario David (3 January 1934 – 26 July 2005) was an Italian footballer and manager, who played as a defender.

Club career
David was born at Udine. He played for 11 seasons in the Serie A (259 games, 20 goals). Throughout his career, he played in a defensive role from 1952 to 1966 for Italian sides Livorno, Lanerossi Vicenza, A.C. Milan and U.C. Sampdoria. He won the European Cup final in 1963 with Milan at Wembley.

International career
At international level, David played for the Italy national football team between 1958 and 1962. He is also remembered for his confrontation with Leonel Sánchez against hosts Chile in the infamous "Battle of Santiago" in the first round of the 1962 FIFA World Cup, which led to him being sent off: after being fouled by David, Sánchez initially punched him in retaliation; David kicked Sanchez in the head a few minutes later, and as a result he was sent off. Chile won the match 2–0, and Italy were eliminated in the first round of the tournament.

Death
David died at Monfalcone in 2005, at the age of 71.

Honours
Milan
 Serie A champion: 1961–62.
 European Cup winner: 1962–63.

See also 
 La zizanie

External links

References

1934 births
2005 deaths
Sportspeople from Udine
Italian footballers
Italy international footballers
U.S. Livorno 1915 players
L.R. Vicenza players
A.S. Roma players
A.C. Milan players
U.C. Sampdoria players
U.S. Alessandria Calcio 1912 players
Serie A players
Serie B players
Italian football managers
A.C. Ancona managers
U.S. Alessandria Calcio 1912 managers
A.C. Monza managers
1962 FIFA World Cup players
Association football defenders
UEFA Champions League winning players
Footballers from Friuli Venezia Giulia
People from Grado, Friuli-Venezia Giulia